Émeraude is a nuclear attack submarine from the first generation of attack submarines of the French Navy.

The boat is the fourth of the Rubis series. Between May 1994 and December 1995, the boat undertook a major refitting, which upgraded capabilities to the level of the Améthyste.

On 30 March 1994, an accidental explosion occurred in the engine compartment while the boat was engaged in a naval exercise off Toulon. The explosion killed ten men, including the commander, who were examining the turbo-alternator room. The boat returned to base under diesel and battery power.

In June 2009, the Émeraude was sent to the mid Atlantic to aid in the search for the flight data recorder and cockpit voice recorder from the ill-fated Air France Flight 447.

In February 2021, the submarine successfully concluded a passage of the South China Sea.

See also 

List of submarines of France

Notes and references 

 Sous-marin nucléaire d'attaque Emeraude netmarine.net

Rubis-class submarines
Ships built in France
Cold War submarines of France
Submarines of France
1986 ships